Pterocarpus cambodianus is a taxonomic synonym of Pterocarpus macrocarpus that may refer to:

Pterocarpus cambodianus 
Pterocarpus cambodianus

References

cambodianus